John Maxwell-Barry, 5th Baron Farnham PC (Ire) (18 January 1767 – 20 September 1838) was an Irish Representative peer and politician.

He was the son of Henry Maxwell, Lord Bishop of Meath, and grandson of John Maxwell, 1st Baron Farnham. He married on 4 July 1789 to Juliana Lucy Annesley (died 10 October 1833), daughter of Arthur Annesley, 1st Earl of Mountnorris, 8th Viscount Valentia.

In 1788, Maxwell-Barry stood as Member of Parliament for Cavan County, however, was declared not duly elected. He later represented Doneraile in the Irish House of Commons from 1792 to 1798, and subsequently Newtown Limavady until the Act of Union in 1801. He was appointed High Sheriff of Carlow for 1795-96 and Governor of co. Cavan for 1805 to 1831. He was also Colonel of the Cavan Militia between 1797 and 1823.

In the British House of Commons, he was Member of Parliament (MP) for Cavan from 1806 to 1824. He was appointed a Privy Councillor in Ireland on 7 July 1809. On the death of his first cousin, he succeeded as 5th Baron Farnham on 23 July 1823 and inherited the Farnham estate. He was elected a representative peer on 17 December 1825.

He died without issue and so the barony and estate passed to his brother Henry.

References 

 
 Kidd, Charles, Williamson, David (editors). Debrett's Peerage and Baronetage (1990 edition). New York: St Martin's Press, 1990., 
 Maxwell family genealogy, part 03, showing the Maxwell of Calderwood, Maxwell of Farnham (co. Cavan), and Maxwell of Finnebrogue families.

External links 
 Cavan County Museum - The Farnham Gallery
 Farnham Estate

1767 births
1838 deaths
Irish representative peers
Irish MPs 1783–1790
Irish MPs 1790–1797
Irish MPs 1798–1800
Members of the Parliament of Ireland (pre-1801) for County Cavan constituencies
Members of the Parliament of Ireland (pre-1801) for County Cork constituencies
Members of the Parliament of Ireland (pre-1801) for County Londonderry constituencies
Members of the Privy Council of Ireland
Members of the Parliament of the United Kingdom for County Cavan constituencies (1801–1922)
UK MPs 1806–1807
UK MPs 1807–1812
UK MPs 1812–1818
UK MPs 1818–1820
UK MPs 1820–1826
Farnham, B5
High Sheriffs of Carlow
Commissioners of the Treasury for Ireland
5